Caribbean's Next Top Model (also referred to as CarribeNTM) is a reality television competition set in the Caribbean, adapted from America's Next Top Model. The show features a group of young aspiring models, from across the Caribbean, compete for the title of Caribbean's Next Top Model and a chance to commence their career in the modeling industry.  Each season is set on a different country as the competition itself makes its way across the Caribbean.

Former Miss Universe, Wendy Fitzwilliam hosts the series accompanied by her fellow judges, International Photographer Pedro Virgil and Caribbean Fashion Expert Socrates McKinney. Twenty-three (23) finalists from across the Caribbean (Barbados, Bahamas, Curaçao, Guadeloupe, Dominican Republic, Jamaica, Cayman Islands, Antigua & Barbuda, Trinidad and Tobago, St. Lucia, Dominica, Guyana, Puerto Rico) compete in an array of challenges to become the next top model.

Featured guests appearing throughout the show include international photographer Matthew Jordan Smith; stylist and fashion expert Freddie Leiba; international models Lene Hall and Teresa Lourenco; music producer Bryce Wilson; fashion designer Claudia Pegus; former NFL player Quentin Groves; Soca musician Machel Montano and international actress, dancer, choreographer and motion capture artist Dani Swan.

CaribeNTM aired across nearly 30 Caribbean territories during primetime programming from February to May 2013 and October-December 2015.

Judges

Cycles

Contestants per country

References

External links
 Caribbean's Next Top Model on Twitter

Caribbean's Next Top Model
2013 television series debuts
2018 television series endings
Television in the Caribbean
Non-American television series based on American television series